The 2012 Campeonato Capixaba de Futebol was the 96th season of Espírito Santo's top professional football league. The competition began on January 21 and ended on May 5. Aracruz won the championship for the 1st time, while Colatina and Serra were relegated.

Format
The tournament consists of a double round-robin format, in which all ten teams play each other twice. The four better-placed teams will face themselves in playoffs matches. The bottom two teams on overall classification will be relegated. Only the champion will qualify for the 2013 Copa do Brasil.

Participating teams

First stage

Standings

Results

Final stage

Semifinals

First leg

Second leg

Finals

First leg

Second leg

References

Capixaba
2012